Silapathar Science College, established in 1996, is a major and general degree college situated in Silapathar, Assam. It offers bachelor's degree courses in science. This college is affiliated with the Dibrugarh University.

Departments

Science
Physics
Chemistry
Mathematics
Anthropology
Computer Science
Botany
Zoology

References

External links
http://silapatharsciencecollege.ac.in/

Universities and colleges in Assam
Colleges affiliated to Dibrugarh University
Educational institutions established in 1996
1996 establishments in Assam